Letterston is a parish and local government community in  north Pembrokeshire,  Wales.

The  name is derived from the medieval owners of the parish, the Lettard family.

History
Twelve men of the parish died in World War 1 and six in World War 2; their names are commemorated on the War Memorial at the parish church of St Giles.

Governance
An electoral ward in the same name exists. This ward stretches south west to Hayscastle. The total ward population taken at the 2011 Census was 2,352.

Demographics
Letterston's population was 1,245, according to the 2011 census; a 24.75 per cent increase since the 998 people noted in 2001.

The 2011 census showed 42.1 per cent of the population could speak Welsh, a fall from 47.2 per cent in 2001.

References

External links
Historical information and sources on GENUKI

Villages in Pembrokeshire
Communities in Pembrokeshire